Gardeniopsis is a monotypic genus of flowering plants in the family Rubiaceae. The genus contains only one species, viz. Gardeniopsis longifolia, which is found in Thailand, Borneo, Malaysia, and Sumatra.

References

Monotypic Rubiaceae genera
Gardenieae